Cathedral of Our Lady of the Rosary, or Our Lady of the Rosary Cathedral, and similar names like Our Lady of the Holy Rosary Cathedral may refer to:

Argentina
 Our Lady of the Rosary Cathedral, Azul
 Our Lady of Rosary Cathedral, Cafayate
 Our Lady of the Rosary Cathedral, Corrientes
 Our Lady of the Rosary Cathedral, Paraná
 Cathedral Basilica of Our Lady of the Rosary, Rosario, Santa Fe

Bangladesh
 Our Lady of the Holy Rosary Cathedral, Chittagong

Brazil
 Our Lady of the Rosary Cathedral, Itabira
 Our Lady of the Rosary Cathedral, Santos

Chile
 Our Lady of the Rosary Cathedral, Copiapó
 Our Lady of the Rosary Cathedral, Valdivia

Colombia
 Our Lady of the Rosary Cathedral, Girardota

Congo
 Our Lady of the Rosary Cathedral, Kisangani

Dominican Republic
 Cathedral of Our Lady of the Rosary (Barahona), cathedral of the Roman Catholic Diocese of Barahona

Ecuador
 Our Lady of the Rosary Cathedral, Puyo

India
 Our Lady of the Rosary Cathedral, cathedral of the Roman Catholic Diocese of Baroda
 Cathedral of Our Lady of the Rosary (Jashpur), in Kunkuri
 Our Lady of Rosary Cathedral, Mangalore

Mexico
 Culiacán Cathedral, called Cathedral Basilica of Our Lady of the Rosary

Mozambique
 Our Lady of the Rosary Cathedral, Beira

Nicaragua
 Cathedral of Our Lady of the Rosary, cathedral of the Roman Catholic Diocese of Bluefields
 Our Lady of the Most Holy Rosary Cathedral, Estelí

Peru
 Our Lady of the Rosary Cathedral, Tacna

Philippines
 Our Lady of the Holy Rosary Cathedral, Dipolog, Zamboanga del Norte
 Our Lady of the Holy Rosary Cathedral, Naval, Biliran

United States
 Our Lady of the Rosary Cathedral (San Bernardino, California)
 Cathedral of Our Lady of the Rosary (Duluth, Minnesota)
 Rosary Cathedral (Toledo, Ohio), called Our Lady, Queen of the Most Holy Rosary Cathedral

Venezuela
 Our Lady of the Rosary Cathedral, Cabimas

See also
 Holy Rosary Cathedral (disambiguation)
 Holy Rosary Church (disambiguation)
 St. Mary's Cathedral, Galle; formally, the Cathedral of St. Mary, Queen of the Holy Rosary